Gisela is a Peruvian monthly magazine, founded by TV host Gisela Valcárcel. It has been online-only magazine since January 2016.

History and profile
Founded in 1993, the magazine was sold nationwide and became one of the most popular magazines in the country and one of the most read in metropolitan Lima (94,000 readers) and the third most read by women (79,500 readers)

In December 2008, after 15 years of circulation, the magazine was suspended because Valcárcel was working hard in Los Reyes de la Pista (Perú) but was relaunched in November 2010 under a new editorial team.

It had women's tips including: Fashion, business, cooking, erotism, dieting and actors' news.

In January 2016 the last print edition of Gisela was published. It was redesigned as an online-only magazine.

References

External links
Official site

1993 establishments in Peru
2016 disestablishments in Peru
Defunct magazines published in Peru
Magazines established in 1993
Magazines disestablished in 2016
Monthly magazines
Magazines published in Peru
Spanish-language magazines
Women's magazines
Online magazines with defunct print editions
History of women in Peru